Abortion in the Netherlands was fully legalized on November 1, 1984, allowing elective abortion care up to the 24th week of the pregnancy. Abortion for  "serious medical reasons" can be performed after 24 weeks. There is a mandatory five-day waiting period for abortions done after your menstrual period is 17 days overdue. However, on June 21, 2022, Dutch parliamentarians approved a law to scrap the mandatory five-day reflection period before undergoing an abortion, saying women, with a joint consultation with the doctor, should be able to determine the time before making a decision. The law is set to come into effect in January of 2023.

History 
Abortion was deemed illegal under the Penal Code of 1886. Convictions were all but precluded, however, by a requirement that the prosecution prove that the fetus had been alive until the abortion. The Morality Acts of 1911 closed this loophole, and strictly barred all abortions, except those performed to save the life of the pregnant woman.

Legalization reached the forefront of public debate in the Netherlands during the 1970s as many other Western European countries liberalized their laws. The Staten-Generaal, however, was unable to reach a consensus between those opposing legalization, those in favor of allowing abortion, and those favoring a compromise measure. A controversial abortion law was passed in 1981 with single swing votes: 76 for and 74 against in the House of Representatives, and 38 for and 37 against in the Senate. The law left abortion a crime, unless performed at a clinic or hospital that is issued an official abortion certificate by the Dutch government, and the woman who is asking for the abortion declares she considers it to be an emergency. The law came into effect on November 1, 1984.

Currently, there are just over 100 Dutch general hospitals certified to perform abortions, and 17 specialized abortion clinics. More than 90% of abortions take place in the specialized clinics.

In the Netherlands, abortion performed by a certified clinic or hospital is effectually allowed at any point between conception and viability, subject to a five-day waiting period. The waiting period does not apply if your menstrual period is less than 17 days overdue (very early stage pregnancy). After the first trimester, the procedure becomes stricter, as two doctors must consent to treatment. In practice, abortions are performed until approximately 24 weeks into pregnancy, although this limit is the topic of ongoing discussion among physicians in the Netherlands, since, due to recent medical advancements, a fetus can sometimes be considered viable prior to 24 weeks. As a result of this debate, abortions are only rarely performed after 22 weeks of pregnancy. Abortions must be performed in a hospital.

The number of abortions has been relatively stable in the 21st century, around 28,000 per year. , the abortion rate was 9.7 abortions per 1000 women aged 15–44 years (0.97%), one of the lowest in the world.

See also 
Abortion in Belgium
Abortion in the United Kingdom
Abortion law
Abortion debate
Religion and abortion

References

External links 
Official Dutch government site on abortion (Dutch)
Official Abortion Physicians site on abortion (Dutch)